Mark Warawa (May 7, 1950  – June 20, 2019) was a Canadian politician. Formerly a businessman and loss prevention officer as well as a city councillor in Abbotsford, British Columbia from 1990 to 2004, Warawa was the Member of Parliament for Langley—Aldergrove (originally called Langley) from 2004 until his death in 2019.

On February 10, 2006, Warawa was named parliamentary secretary to the Minister of the Environment. Less recently, he served as a member of the Standing Committee on Justice, Human Rights, Public Safety and Emergency Preparedness.

Warawa introduced a private member's bill in the House of Commons, condemning discrimination against females in sex-selective abortion.

He and his wife, Diane, lived in Langley and had five children. His son Ryan was the Conservative candidate in Vancouver East in the 2008 election, losing to Libby Davies of the NDP.

Warawa died of pancreatic cancer on June 20, 2019.

Electoral record

References

External links
 

1950 births
2019 deaths
Members of the House of Commons of Canada from British Columbia
British Columbia municipal councillors
Businesspeople from British Columbia
Businesspeople in insurance
Canadian Mennonites
Canadian anti-abortion activists
Conservative Party of Canada MPs
Deaths from cancer in British Columbia
Deaths from pancreatic cancer
People from Abbotsford, British Columbia
People from Langley, British Columbia (district municipality)
Reform Party of British Columbia candidates in British Columbia provincial elections
21st-century Canadian politicians
Place of birth missing